State Route 59 (SR 59) is a  state highway that travels southwest-to-northeast through portions of Jackson, Banks, Franklin, and Hart counties in the northeastern part of the U.S. state of Georgia. The highway connects Commerce with SR 77 near the shore of Lake Hartwell, via Carnesville and Lavonia. It closely parallels Interstate 85 (I-85).

Route description
SR 59 begins at an intersection with U.S. Route 441 (US 441)/SR 15 (Homer Road) in the northeastern part of Commerce within Jackson County. This intersection also marks the northern terminus of US 441 Business/SR 15 Alternate, which take the Homer Road name. South of here, US 441/SR 15 are known as Veterans Memorial Parkway. Almost immediately, SR 59 enters Banks County. The only major intersections in the county are with the eastern terminus of SR 164 and the southern terminus of SR 63. In Franklin County, it intersects SR 51 before meeting the eastern terminus of SR 198. Less than  later, the highway intersects SR 106, which travels concurrent with it into Carnesville. At the end of the concurrency, SR 59 splits off to continue its northeast routing. In Lavonia, SR 59 intersects SR 17, before meeting the northern terminus of SR 77 Connector. About  later, the road enters Hart County. It intersects SR 77 and the state highway ends. The road continues to the northeast and curves to the east before ending along the northwestern shore of Lake Hartwell.

History

Before the construction of Lake Hartwell, SR 59 continued into South Carolina as South Carolina Highway 59 (SC 59). SR 59 is not concurrent with I-85 on either side of the lake and the two highways do not officially connect.

The section of SR 59 between SR 77 and the shoreline of Lake Hartwell was transferred to county maintenance between 1990 and 1993.

Major intersections

See also

References

External links

059
Transportation in Jackson County, Georgia
Transportation in Banks County, Georgia
Transportation in Franklin County, Georgia
Transportation in Hart County, Georgia